Influenza A virus subtype H5 may refer to one of nine subtypes of Influenza A virus:

Influenza A virus subtype H5N1
Influenza A virus subtype H5N2
Influenza A virus subtype H5N3
Influenza A virus subtype H5N4
Influenza A virus subtype H5N5
Influenza A virus subtype H5N6
Influenza A virus subtype H5N7
Influenza A virus subtype H5N8
Influenza A virus subtype H5N9